The Northern Lights most often refers to the aurora borealis.

(The) Northern Light(s) may also refer to:

Arts and entertainment

Film 
 Northern Lights (1978 film), about the Nonpartisan League in North Dakota
 Northern Lights (1997 film), a Disney movie
 Northern Lights (2001 film), a Russian film
 Northern Lights (2009 film), or Nora Roberts' Northern Lights, a TV film
 Northern Light (film), a 2006 Dutch film
 Northern Lights: A Journey to Love, a 2017 Filipino drama

Television and radio 
 Northern Lights (TV series), a 2006 British comedy-drama series
 "Northern Lights", a 2000 episode of Dawson's Creek
 Northern Lights (radio show), a Canadian programme until 2007

Literature 
 Northern Lights (Pullman novel), by Philip Pullman, 1995
 Northern Lights (O'Brien novel), by Tim O'Brien, 1975
 Northern Lights, a 2009 novel by Nora Roberts, on which the 2009 film is based
 Severni sij ('Northern Lights'), a 1984 novel and 2005 play by Drago Jančar
 A Northern Light, a 2003 historical novel by Jennifer Donnelly
 The Northern Light (college newspaper), of the University of Alaska Anchorage
 The Northern Light (Maine), a weekly newspaper
 The Northern Light (novel), by A. J. Cronin, 1958
 The Northern Lights, a 1991 novel by Howard Norman
 The Northern Lights, a 2002 biography of Kristian Birkeland by Lucy Jago

Music 
 Northern lights chord, an 11-note chord
 Northern Lights (bluegrass band), an American group
 Northern Lights (Canadian band), a 1985 supergroup that recorded "Tears Are Not Enough"
 Toronto Northern Lights, a Canadian men's chorus
 Hootenanny Singers, or The Northern Lights, a Swedish folk group

Albums 
 Northern Light (Ask Embla album) (2013)
 Northern Light (Jon Christos album) (2005)
 Northern Light (Covenant album) (2002)
 Northern Lights (Gareth Emery album) (2010)
 Northern Lights (Northern Lights album)
 Northern Lights (Sissel album) (2007)
 Northern Lights – Southern Cross, a 1975 album by the Band
 Northern Lights, a 1996 EP by Klaus Waldeck
 Northern Lights, a 2016 album by Zeds Dead

Songs 
 "Northern Light" (song), a 2012 song by Basshunter
 "Northern Lights" (song), a 1978 song by Renaissance
 "Northern Lites", a 1999 song by Super Furry Animals
 "Northern Lights", a 2009 song by Dala from Everyone Is Someone
 "Northern Lights", a 2018 song by Death Cab for Cutie from Thank You for Today
 "Northern Lights", a 2014 song by DZ Deathrays 
 "Northern Ligths", a 2022 song by Ella Henderson from her second album Everything I Didn't Say
 "Northern Lights", a 2002 song by Goldenhorse from Riverhead
 "Northern Lights", a 2002 song by Megumi Hayashibara
 "Northern Lights", a 2011 song by St. Vincent from Strange Mercy
 "Northern Lights", a 2018 song by Soft Cell
 "Northern Lights", a 2013 song by Thirty Seconds to Mars from Love, Lust, Faith and Dreams
 "Northern Lights", a 1994 song by Timo Tolkki from Classical Variations and Themes
 "Northern Lights", a 2019 song by Hunter Brothers from State of Mind
 "Northern Lights", a 1993 song by Sentenced from North from Here
"Transformation", a  2003 song by Phil Collins From Brother Bear

Other uses in arts and entertainment
 Northern Lights, a fictional element in TV series Person of Interest

Businesses and organisations
 Northern Lights Casino, in Prince Albert, Saskatchewan, Canada
 Northern Lights College, in British Columbia, Canada
 Northern Lights Community School, in Warba, Minnesota, U.S.
 Northern Light Group, an American knowledge management company
 its "Northern Light", an early Web search engine (1996–2002)
 Northern Lights Secondary School, in Moosonee, Ontario, Canada
 Northern Lights Shopping Center, in Economy, Pennsylvania, U.S.

Transportation
 Northern Light (clipper), an American ship 1851–1862
 Northern Light (sternwheeler), active on Puget Sound in the 1900s
 Northern Light (pilot boat), an American pilot boat
 SS Northern Lights, later SS El Faro, an American cargo ship
 Northern Lights (train), a named British passenger train
 Northern Light (spacecraft), a concept mission for a robotic mission to Mars

Other uses 
 Northern Lights (cannabis), a strain of cannabis
 Northern Lights (carbon capture project), in Norway
 Northern Lights (football team), in New Zealand
 Northern Lights (pipeline), in Russia and Belarus
 The Northern Lights (whiskey), a blended Canadian whisky
 Northern Lights suplex, a move in professional wrestling
 Northern Lights, a codename an eMac computer model
 County of Northern Lights, a municipal district in Alberta, Canada
 Operation Northern Lights, a 2006 U.S. military operation in Iraq

See also 

 The Golden Compass (film), a 2007 film adaption Northern Lights by Philip Pullman
 Noorderlicht, meaning Northern Light, an annual Dutch photographic festival
 Northern Lighthouse Board, formerly Commissioners of Northern Light Houses, the lighthouse authority for Scotland
 Northern Lights Cathedral, in Troms og Finnmark county, Norway
 Northern Lights Council of the Boy Scouts of America
 Southern Lights (disambiguation)